Longitudinal erythronychia presents with longitudinal red bands in the nail plate that commence in the matrix and extend to the point of separation of the nail plate and nailbed, and may occur on multiple nails with inflammatory conditions such as lichen planus or Darier's disease.

See also
Nail anatomy
 List of cutaneous conditions

References

 
Conditions of the skin appendages